Aladdin's Lantern is a 1938 Our Gang short comedy film directed by Gordon Douglas.  It was the 171st Our Gang short (172nd episode, 83rd talking short, 84th talking episode, and third MGM produced episode) that was released.

Plot
The gang members are putting on a musical show about Aladdin and his lamp. While Spanky, Alfalfa and Darla endeavor to stick to the script (such as it is), their efforts are undermined by smaller kids Buckwheat and Porky. The ending finds Alfalfa getting his just deserts as his bottom gets set on fire in front of the audience. They roar in laughter as his seat cooks to a medium rare and his face turns bright red in embarrassment. As the show fades to black Alfalfa is happily cooling his blistered backside in a washing machine filled with cold water while the water boils from the heat and steam rises around him.

Cast

The Gang
 Darla Hood as Darla
 Eugene Lee as Porky
 George McFarland as Spanky / Caliph
 Carl Switzer as Alfalfa / Aladdin
 Billie Thomas as Buckwheat
 Gary Jasgar as Gary
 Darwood Kaye as Waldo
 Leonard Landy as Deacon
 Joe "Corky" Geil as Tap dancing boy
 Billy Minderhout as Genie
 George the Monkey as Elmer

Dancers and audience extras
Gloria Brown, Bobby Callahan, Dix Davis, Tim Davis, Rae-Nell Laskey, Henry Lee, Peggy Lynch, Pricilla Montgomery, Harold Switzer, Marylyn Astor Thorpe, Laura June Williams

Notes
Aladdin's Lantern was the last episode directed by Gordon Douglas. It was also the first MGM entry produced with George McFarland as Spanky. He returned from loan to other studios. Gordon Douglas left the gang and MGM to return to Hal Roach Studios.

See also
 Our Gang filmography

References

External links

1938 films
American black-and-white films
Films directed by Gordon Douglas
Metro-Goldwyn-Mayer short films
1938 comedy films
Our Gang films
1938 short films
1930s American films